Segundo López or Segundo López, Urban Adventurer (Spanish:Segundo López, aventurero urbano) is a 1953 Spanish drama film directed by and starring Ana Mariscal. It marked the directoral debut of Mariscal, a leading actress of General Franco's Spain. The film's style contains elements of neorealism, dealing with social issues primarily affecting migrants from the countryside.

Plot 
An honest man from the provinces arrives in Madrid for a living, with no more baggage than a little money and plainness. He befriends a street urchin, "The Chirri", and both live countless urban adventures.

Cast

References

Bibliography 
 Bentley, Bernard. A Companion to Spanish Cinema. Boydell & Brewer 2008.

External links 
 

1953 drama films
Spanish drama films
1953 films
1950s Spanish-language films
Films directed by Ana Mariscal
Films set in Madrid
Spanish black-and-white films
Films about internal migration
1950s Spanish films